Hythe is a hamlet in northwest Alberta, Canada within the County of Grande Prairie No. 1. It held village status prior to July 2021.

History 
Hythe's post office was established in 1914 and named after Hythe, Kent in England. The community was incorporated as a village on August 31, 1929. The village dissolved becoming a hamlet under the jurisdiction of the County of Grande Prairie No. 1 on July 1, 2021.

Geography 
Hythe is located in an area known as the Peace River Country that straddles northwest Alberta and northeast British Columbia.

Demographics 

In the 2016 Census of Population conducted by Statistics Canada, Hythe had a population of 827 living in 289 of its 320 total private dwellings, a  change from its 2011 population of 820.

Economy 
The economy of Hythe and area is driven by agriculture, forestry and oil and gas.

Arts and culture 
Hythe hosts an annual agricultural fair and celebrates an annual South Peace Centennial Museum Day.

Attractions 
Recreational amenities in Hythe include a hockey arena, a curling rink and ball diamonds. It also has an outdoor swimming pool and is home to the Hythe Motor Speedway, which operates annually between May and September.

Education 
Hythe Regional School, operated by Peace Wapiti School Division No. 76, offers kindergarten through grade nine schooling to children of Hythe and nearby communities.

See also 
List of communities in Alberta
List of villages in Alberta

References

External links 

1929 establishments in Alberta
2021 disestablishments in Alberta
Hamlets in Alberta